Lilián Buglia Mendoza (born 22 January 1934) is an Argentine sprinter. She competed in the women's 100 metres at the 1952 Summer Olympics.

References

1934 births
Living people
Athletes (track and field) at the 1952 Summer Olympics
Argentine female sprinters
Argentine female long jumpers
Olympic athletes of Argentina
Place of birth missing (living people)
Pan American Games medalists in athletics (track and field)
Pan American Games silver medalists for Argentina
Athletes (track and field) at the 1951 Pan American Games
Athletes (track and field) at the 1955 Pan American Games
Medalists at the 1955 Pan American Games
20th-century Argentine women